Eulophinae is a subfamily of wasps in the family Eulophidae which includes over 90 genera.

Genera
The genera included in Eulophinae are:

Alibertia Risbec, 1951 
Alophomorphella Girault, 1913 
Alophomyia Ashmead, 1904 
Alveoplectrus Wijesekara and Schauff, 1997 
Anumanniola Narendran, 2003 
Arachnolophus Kamijo, 1996 
Aroplectrus Lin, 1963 
Ascotolinx Girault, 1913 
Aulogymnus Förster, 1851 
Austeulophus Boucek, 1988 
Boucekiola Narendran, 2005 
Cirrospiloidelleus Girault, 1913 
Cirrospilus Westwood, 1832 
Clotildiella Erdös, 1964 
Cobarus Boucek, 1988 
Colpoclypeus Lucchese, 1941 
Cristelacher Schauff and LaSalle, 1993 
Dahlbominus Hincks, 1945 
Dasyeulophus Schauff and LaSalle, 1993 
Dermatopelte Erdös and Novicky, 1951 
Deutereulophus Schulz, 1904 
Diaulinopsis Crawford, 1912 
Diaulomorpha Ashmead, 1900 
Dichatomus Förster, 1878 
Dicladocerus Westwood, 1832 
Diglyphomorpha Ashmead, 1904 
Diglyphomorphomyia Girault, 1913 
Diglyphus Walker, 1844 
Dimmockia Ashmead, 1904 
Dineulophus De Santis, 1985 
Elachertomorpha Ashmead, 1904 
Elachertus Spinola, 1811 
Elasmus Westwood, 1833 
Eulophinusia Girault, 1913 
Eulophomorpha Dodd, 1915 
Eulophomyia De Santis, 1957 
Eulophus Geoffroy, 1762 
Euplectromorpha Girault, 1913 
Euplectrophelinus Girault, 1913 
Euplectrus Westwood, 1832 
Eupronotius Boucek, 1988 
Eurycephaloplectrus Wijesekara and Schauff, 1997 
Gallowayia Boucek, 1988 
Gattonia Boucek, 1988 
Ginsiella Erdös, 1951 
Grotiusomyia Girault, 1917 
Hamonia Risbec, 1957 
Hayatiola Narendran, 2006 
Hemiptarsenus Westwood, 1833 
Hoplocrepis Ashmead, 1890
Hyssopus  Girault, 1916 
Melittobiopsis  Timberlake, 1926 
Meruacesa Koçak and Kemal, 2009 
Metaplectrus Ferrière, 1941
Microlycus Thomson, 1878 
Miotropis Thomson, 1878 
Mohaniella Khan, 1995 
Naumanniola Boucek, 1988 
Necremnoides Girault, 1913 
Necremnus Thomson, 1878 
Nesympiesis Boucek, 1988 
Notanisomorphella Girault, 1913 
Noyesius Boucek, 1988 
Ogmoelachertus Schauff, 2000 
Oxycantha Surekha and Ubaidillah, 1996
Paraolinx Ashmead, 1894 
Pauahiana Yoshimoto, 1965 
Perinetia Risbec, 1952 
Petiolacus Boucek, 1988 
Platyplectrus Ferrière, 1941 
Pnigalio Schrank, 1802 
Propodeochertus Narendran, 2011 
Pseudiglyphus Girault, 1915 
Pseudiglyphus Girault, 1915 
Renaniana Girault, 1931 
Rhicnopelte Förster, 1878 
Ryhonos Boucek, 1988 
Semielacher Boucek, 1988 
Setelacher Boucek, 1988 
Seyrigina Risbec, 1952 
Skoka Boucek, 1988 
Stenomesius Westwood, 1833 
Stenopetius Boucek, 1988 
Sureshanella Narendran, 2011 
Sympiesis Förster, 1856 
Sympiesomorpha Ashmead, 1904 
Tooloomius Boucek, 1988 
Trichospilus Ferrière, 1930 
Trielacher Boucek, 1988 
Tylomischus De Santis, 1972 
Xanthella Moczár, 1950 
Zagrammosoma Ashmead, 1904 
Zasympiesis Boucek, 1988 
Zealachertus Boucek, 1978

References

Eulophidae
Hymenoptera subfamilies